Alessandro "Alex" Zanardi (born 23 October 1966) is an Italian professional racing driver and paracyclist. He won the CART championship in 1997 and 1998, and took 15 wins in the series. He also raced in Formula One from 1991 to 1994 and again in 1999; his best result was a sixth-place finish in the 1993 Brazilian GP. He returned to CART in 2001, but a major crash in the 2001 American Memorial resulted in the amputation of his legs. He returned to racing less than two years after the accident; competing in the European Touring Car Championship in 2003–2004 and then in the World Touring Car Championship between 2005 and 2009, scoring four wins.

In addition to continuing to race cars, Zanardi took up competition in handcycling, a form of paralympic cycling, with the stated goal of representing Italy at the 2012 Summer Paralympics. In September 2011, Zanardi won his first senior international handcycling medal, the silver medal in the H4 category time trial at the UCI World Road Para-Cycling Championships. In September 2012 he won gold medals at the London Paralympics in the individual H4 time trial and the individual H4 road race, followed by a silver medal in the mixed H1-4 team relay, and in September 2016 he won a gold and a silver medal at the 2016 Paralympics in Rio de Janeiro.

On 19 June 2020, Zanardi was involved in a serious road accident while competing in the Obiettivo tricolore handcycling race, near Siena. After being transferred to hospital, Zanardi underwent three hours of neurosurgery and maxillofacial surgery before being placed in a medically induced coma.

Early and personal life
Alex Zanardi was born in Bologna, Italy on 23 October 1966, son of Dino and Anna Zanardi. His family moved to the town of Castel Maggiore on the city's outskirts when he was four years of age. His sister Cristina was a promising swimmer prior to her death in an automobile collision in 1979.

Zanardi began racing karts at age 13. He built his kart from the wheels of a dustbin and pipes from his father's work. In 1988, he joined the Italian Formula 3 series, with a fifth place as his highest finish. In 1989, Zanardi took two pole positions and three podiums despite his team's switching to unleaded fuel, which reduced his car's engine power. In 1991, he moved up to the Formula 3000 series with the Il Barone Rampante team, themselves newcomers to the series. He won his F3000 debut race, scoring two more wins that season and finishing second in the championship.

Motor racing

Formula One (1991–1994)
After testing for the Footwork team, Zanardi mounted a strong season in F3000. Eddie Jordan looked to replace Roberto Moreno for the remainder of the 1991 season, bringing in Zanardi for the last three races. Zanardi finished two of them, both in 9th place. In , however, Zanardi had to be content with guest drives for Minardi, replacing the injured Christian Fittipaldi. In the off-season, he tested for Benetton, but he contracted with Lotus for 1993. He later stated that in hindsight, he should have stayed on as the Benetton test driver as he would likely have been given a full-time drive for 1994 following Riccardo Patrese's retirement, where he would have been in a race-winning car alongside that year's world champion Michael Schumacher.

Zanardi compared reasonably to teammate Johnny Herbert in 1993 and was important in fine-tuning the team's active suspension system, scoring his only F1 point at the Brazilian Grand Prix. He was injured when an elderly motorist collided with his bicycle, knocking him down and running over Zanardi's left foot. Despite several broken bones, Zanardi raced in Germany, but he spun out and did not finish. Zanardi's season ended prematurely after he sustained a concussion as a result of a crash in practice for the Belgian Grand Prix.

Still recovering, Zanardi missed the beginning of the  season while he was working as a test driver for Lotus, but he returned in the Spanish Grand Prix, replacing Pedro Lamy, who had been injured in a testing crash. However, Lotus struggled in its final season in F1 and Zanardi failed to score a single point or qualify higher than 13th. For the races in Belgium and Portugal, Zanardi was replaced by Belgian pay driver Philippe Adams.

With Lotus Formula One defunct, Zanardi practiced to race in sports car racing. His first meeting was at a Porsche Supercup event at Imola. Zanardi later raced at a four-hour event at Donington Park, where he and Alex Portman retired with eight minutes remaining despite leading by over a lap. The pair managed to finish 4th at a rainy day race at Silverstone.

CART Championship series

During 1995, Zanardi went to the United States for a drive in the CART Series. He felt that finding a race seat would be easy with Formula One experience, but no teams drew any interest. However, Reynard Commercial Director Rick Gorne managed to secure Zanardi a test drive at Homestead with Chip Ganassi Racing. Zanardi officially signed a contract on 23 October 1995. The team's race engineer Mo Nunn advised Chip against signing him, as he believed Italian drivers were too prone to mistakes.

He rapidly became one of the series' most popular drivers. He took the pole for his second race, although his first win didn't come until mid-season. Overall, he won three races in his rookie season and six pole positions, finishing third in the championship behind teammate Jimmy Vasser and Michael Andretti. He and Andretti were level on points but Andretti took second place by virtue of having five race wins compared to Zanardi's three. Zanardi was named Rookie of the Year.

A win came at Mazda Raceway Laguna Seca for the final race of the 1996 season, where he conducted a highly risky overtake at the Corkscrew corner (known to many racing fans as "The Pass"; the maneuver was banned for future years), on race leader Bryan Herta, having fought his way through the field.

Zanardi improved his form in CART in 1997, winning five of seventeen races, including three in a row and four of the five rounds held in the mid to late portion of the season en route to winning the Drivers' Championship. 1998 saw Zanardi even more dominant in his Ganassi Reynard-Honda, winning 7 of 19 races with an incredible 15 podiums in those 19 races. He won four races in a row in June and July en route to his second consecutive CART title, the third in a row for Ganassi and Honda, and the fourth for Reynard.

After winning a race, Zanardi was fond of spinning his car around in tight circles, leaving circular doughnut-shaped patterns of tyre rubber on the track; this would eventually become a popular means of celebrating race wins all across America.

Return to Formula One

Zanardi's CART success caught the attention of Sir Frank Williams, with whom he made contact in 1997, to inform them he would be available for contract negotiations if needed. Williams visited Zanardi, who signed a three-year contract in July 1998 which was publicly confirmed in September of that year. He began testing at the end of that year alongside test driver Juan Pablo Montoya. Zanardi also received offers from BAR and Honda. In Australia, Zanardi was 9th quickest in the first free practice session but had limited track time due to reliability issues and traffic in qualifying meant he could only start 15th. He showed promise in the warm-up with 6th but the race saw him crash out on lap 21. Moving on to Brazil, Zanardi once again experienced limited time on the track which was mainly due to engine issues. He started 16th and retired with a differential failure. Zanardi also incurred a $5,000 fine for speeding in the pit lane.

At Imola, his form improved with a start position of 10th. The race itself threw up a surprise for Zanardi. His car was suffering electronic issues and ran a steady 7th in the closing stages and ran over oil from Johnny Herbert's Stewart at the Villeneuve chicane and spun into the gravel. Zanardi out-qualified Schumacher at Monaco by over half a second. More drama occurred on race day as the seat in his Williams broke off during the early stages of the race but he managed to finish 8th and last of the runners. In Spain, despite setting the 5th-quickest lap in first free practice, a wrong set-up placed Zanardi 17th in qualifying. His car's gearbox seized after a pit stop. Similar problems occurred in Canada where Friday practice running was limited. Managing to out-qualify Schumacher, Zanardi's race was incident filled. Whilst running in 8th, he spun off into the gravel trap early on and dropped to last. Further time was lost when leaving the pit lane during a safety car period and receiving a stop-go penalty. A further excursion occurred when a maneuver on Luca Badoer's Minardi ended with Zanardi crashing out.

The wet qualifying for the French Grand Prix saw him qualify 15th after the Williams team misread conditions and aquaplaned during the race. At Silverstone, Zanardi qualified 13th and finished 11th. In Austria, he started 14th. In the first part of the race, Zanardi's radio communications failed and around lap 33, his team hung out pit boards, calling him in to pit, but a battle with Pedro Diniz distracted Zanardi, causing him to miss the board twice, and eventually ran out of fuel. Mechanical failures saw Zanardi with premature exits from the next two races before he finished eighth in Belgium.

In Monza, Zanardi qualified 4th ahead of teammate Ralf Schumacher. He overtook David Coulthard and Heinz-Harald Frentzen at the start. Frentzen took over 2nd from Zanardi at the Roggia chicane. On the third lap, the floor on the Williams became loose and he was forced to wave his rivals past, but managed to finish 7th. At the next round at the Nürburgring, Zanardi qualified in 18th, placing blame on traffic. He performed well at the start but had to take avoiding action when Alexander Wurz clipped Pedro Diniz. The incident left Zanardi in last position but he regained positions before his car succumbed to his engine stalling. The penultimate round in Malaysia had seen Zanardi start from 16th with a first-lap collision that damaged his front rim with a pit-stop preventing better progress. He later ran wide, which caused damage to the car radiators and prompted another pit-stop with Zanardi finishing 10th.

The final race of the season was in Japan, where he qualified 16th. In the race, Zanardi overtook many of his rivals, driving as high as 9th before his pit-lane limiter activated with the engine shutting off when he attempted to turn off the limiter on the first lap. At the end of the season, Zanardi and the Williams team decided to go their separate ways with an estimated cost of $4 million for the termination of Zanardi's contract.

CART return and Lausitzring crash

In the 2000 season Zanardi was not signed for a team, but was interested in a CART comeback. He tested for Mo Nunn in July at Sebring driving for 246 laps and opted to sign to the team for 2001.

For most of the season, Zanardi had little success, with three top-ten finishes and a best result of fourth place in the 2001 Molson Indy Toronto. During the 2001 American Memorial at the EuroSpeedway Lausitz on 15 September 2001, Zanardi started from the back of the grid and was gaining the upper hand of the race. After a late pit stop, Zanardi on cold tyres was attempting to merge back onto the track when he accelerated abruptly, lost control of his car, and spun onto the race track into the direct path of Patrick Carpentier. Carpentier was able to avoid him, but Alex Tagliani, who was just behind Carpentier at the time, was not, and Zanardi's car was blindsided from behind the front wheel, severing the nose of the car. Zanardi lost both legs (one at and one above the knee) in the impact and nearly three-quarters of his blood volume, though rapid medical intervention saved his life. Further portions of his legs were amputated during three hours of surgery to clean and facilitate closing the wounds.

Post-amputation racing
Zanardi was fitted with two prosthetic limbs and began rehabilitating. Dissatisfied with the limitations of legs available commercially, Zanardi designed and built his own custom legs, to allow him to compare the weight and stiffness of various feet to find the ones most suitable for racing. In 2002, CART honoured Zanardi by allowing him to wave the checkered flag in Toronto, Canada. In 2003, Zanardi was ready to take to the track again, with the aid of hand-operated brake and accelerator controls. Before the 2003 German 500 began, Zanardi ceremonially drove the thirteen laps he never finished at the Lausitzring in 2001. His fastest lap time of 37.487 seconds would have qualified him fifth in the actual race.

Zanardi competed at Monza, Italy in a round of the 2003 European Touring Car Championship, in his first race since the accident in a touring car modified to allow the use of his prosthetic feet, finishing the race in seventh. In 2004, Zanardi returned to racing full-time, driving for Roberto Ravaglia's BMW Team Italy-Spain in the FIA European Touring Car Championship. In 2005, the series became the World Touring Car Championship by adding two non-European races. On 24 August 2005, Zanardi won his first world series race, celebrating with a series of trademark "donuts". He took further wins at Istanbul in 2006 and Brno in 2008 and 2009. At the end of the 2009 season, he announced his retirement from the WTCC. He took the 2005 Italian Superturismo Championship as organised by the Automobile Club d'Italia with eight victories from twelve races in a Team BMW Italy-entered BMW 320si run by ROAL Motorsport.

Zanardi returned to a Formula One car in late November 2006 at a testing session for BMW Sauber in Valencia, Spain. The car had been specially adapted to have hand controls fitted on the steering wheel. After the drive, Zanardi said that the main problem he was having was using only his right hand to steer through corners, as his left operated the throttle. Zanardi said, "Of course, I know that I won't get a contract with the Formula One team, however having the chance to drive an F1 racer again is just incredible."

Since 2004, CRG has made and sold a range of kart chassis bearing Zanardi's name. The Zanardi chassis has been raced in the European KF1 Championship and World Championship as well as in many other racing events worldwide. Dutch driver Nyck de Vries won the CIK-FIA Karting World Championship in 2010 and 2011 with Zanardi karts.

In November 2012, Zanardi tested a BMW DTM touring car, completing 32 laps of the Nürburgring. He later said that the test had rekindled his interest in motor racing, and in January 2014, it was announced that he would return to motorsport in the 2014 Blancpain Sprint Series season, racing a BMW Z4 GT3 for Ravaglia's ROAL Motorsport team. In 2018, he made a one-off appearance in the Deutsche Tourenwagen Masters, driving a BMW M4 DTM in the Misano round of the series. After qualifying in last place for both races, he finished 12th out of 13 finishers in the first race before placing fifth in the second race in mixed weather: after the race he said that as radio communication between drivers and the pits is banned in the DTM except when cars are in the pit lane, when his team told him of his fifth-place finish he initially believed it was a joke at his expense.

Zanardi returned to American motor racing by entering the 2019 24 Hours of Daytona that January. Using a similar set of controls as the BMW M4 that he used in the DTM series, the GTLM-specification BMW M8 GTE had a special steering wheel that allowed him to actuate the accelerator with his left hand and shift with his right hand. Brakes were applied with a large handle with by his right hand. The brake handle also had a downshift trigger on it so he can still "engine brake" like his teammates John Edwards, Jesse Krohn and Chaz Mostert. The team finished 32nd overall and ninth in the GTLM category.

Zanardi Edition NSX
The Alex Zanardi Edition Acura NSX was introduced in 1999 for the U.S. market to commemorate Zanardi's two back-to-back CART championship wins for Honda in 1997 and 1998. The car features revised suspension, as well as a fixed roof, lightweight BBS wheels, single-pane rear glass, a lightweight rear spoiler, manual steering, and a lighter battery, making it  lighter than the targa top version. Only 51 examples were ever built, and all were painted in the newly introduced New Formula Red Color Code: R-510 which subsequently replaced Formula Red Color Code: R-77 in all markets from 2000 onward, to reflect the colour of the car he drove for Chip Ganassi Racing.

Handcycling and triathlon
After the injuries sustained from his 2001 racing accident, Zanardi decided to return to sport, taking up handcycling. In 2007, he achieved 4th place in the New York City Marathon in the handcycle division, after only four weeks of training. He has since taken up handcycling in earnest, and competed at the Para-Cycling Road World Championships in 2009. He stated that he was targeting a place in the Italian team for the 2012 Summer Paralympics. In 2009, he won the Venice Marathon in the category for disabled people, riding his wheelchair in one hour, thirteen minutes, 56 seconds, and won the Rome City Marathon in 2010, in a time of one hour, fifteen minutes, 53 seconds. In 2011, at his fourth attempt, Zanardi won the New York City Marathon in his handcycling class.

On 5 September 2012, Zanardi won a gold medal in the men's road time trial H4 at the 2012 Paralympic Games in London, finishing 27.14 seconds ahead of Nobert Mosandi at Brands Hatch in Kent. Two days later, he won the individual H4 road race, ahead of Ernst van Dyk (South Africa) and Wim Decleir (Belgium), and then a silver medal for Italy in the mixed team relay H1-4 on 8 September 2012. The bike used by Zanardi was constructed by Italian racecar constructor Dallara. As a result, Zanardi was named one of "The Men of the Year 2012" by Top Gear. Zanardi was also voted the best male athlete of the 2012 Paralympics.

Before the Games in London, he expressed interest in returning to auto racing for the 2013 Indianapolis 500; while this failed to pan out, at the event he was presented with his 1996 CART Laguna Seca-winning car by Target Chip Ganassi Racing.

Zanardi completed the 2014 Ironman World Championship with a time of 9:47'14, ranking 272nd overall and 19th out of 247 in the 45–49-year category. He used a handbike for the cycling section and a wheelchair for the running section. In September 2015, Zanardi announced that he would be taking part in the Berlin Marathon using a recumbent hand cycle. At the 2016 Summer Paralympics in Rio de Janeiro he won the gold medals in the H5 category road cycling men's time trial and mixed team relay, and also silver in the road race. On 22 September 2018, in a triathlon competition in Cervia, Italy, Zanardi smashed the Ironman world record in the category of disabled people, with a time of 8:26'6. With that time, he also ranked fifth overall in the competition.

2020 cycling accident
On 19 June 2020, Zanardi was involved in a serious accident while competing in the Obiettivo tricolore Italian national road race for paralympic athletes. The accident occurred on State Highway 146 between Pienza and San Quirico. According to Gazzetta dello Sport, Zanardi was descending down a hill when he lost control of his handbike and veered into an oncoming truck, leading to severe facial and cranial trauma. Emergency services attended the scene after other competitors helped to raise the alarm, and Zanardi was airlifted to the Santa Maria alle Scotte Hospital in Siena. He was treated in intensive care for serious head injuries. In September 2020, it was reported that Zanardi was showing signs of interaction but that his condition remained "serious," and that he had undergone several surgeries to reconstruct his face. In November 2020, Zanardi was transferred to a hospital in Padua, which was closer to his home to continue his recovery. In December 2020, it was reported that Zanardi regained his sight and hearing; he could also respond non-verbally to questions and shake hands on demand. In January 2021, it was reported that Zanardi was able to speak again following a waking surgery. In December 2021, 18 months after the accident, he was able to return home, to continue his rehabilitation.

Personal life
Zanardi has been married to Daniela (née Manni) since 1996, and they have a son, Niccolò (born 7 September 1998). He has co-written two books based on his life, Alex Zanardi: My Story (2004) with Gianluca Gasparini and Alex Zanardi: My Sweetest Victory (2004). Zanardi and his story have been featured on the HBO sports series Real Sports with Bryant Gumbel. Zanardi wrote the opening chapters for the books of Steve Olvey, the former CART medical director, including, Rapid Response: My Inside Story as a Motor Racing Life Saver.

He has received multiple awards, including the Autosport Gregor Grant Award 1998 & 2003; the Laureus World Sports Award for Comeback of the Year 2005; and the Gazzetta Legend Award 2015. He was inducted into the Motorsports Hall of Fame of America in 2013 and will be inducted into Long Beach Motorsports walk of fame in 2022.

In July 2022 Zanardi was hospitalized after a fire broke out at his home in Italy due to a defect on his home's solar panels which damaged medical equipment he used while recovering from his hand-cycling crash, he was later released back to his home 76 days later in September.

Racing record

Career summary

† As Zanardi was a guest driver, he was ineligible for championship points.

Complete International Formula 3000 results
(key) (Races in bold indicate pole position) (Races
in italics indicate fastest lap)

Complete Formula One results
(key)

Complete CART results
(key)

International Race of Champions
(key) (Bold – Pole position. * – Most laps led.)

Complete World Touring Car Championship results
(key) (Races in bold indicate pole position) (Races in italics indicate fastest lap)

Complete Blancpain Sprint Series results

Complete Deutsche Tourenwagen Masters results
(key) (Races in bold indicate pole position) (Races in italics indicate fastest lap)

† As Zanardi was a guest driver, he was ineligible for championship points.

Complete WeatherTech SportsCar Championship results
(key) (Races in bold indicate pole position; results in italics indicate fastest lap)

References

External links
 
 
 İki Bacağını Kazada Kaybeden Yarışçı Alex Zanardi'nin Hikayesi  (English title: The amazing story of racing driver Alex Zanardi who lost both legs in an accident)

1966 births
Living people
Sportspeople from Bologna
Italian racing drivers
Italian Formula One drivers
Champ Car champions
Champ Car drivers
International Formula 3000 drivers
Italian Formula Three Championship drivers
World Touring Car Championship drivers
International Race of Champions drivers
Jordan Formula One drivers
Minardi Formula One drivers
Team Lotus Formula One drivers
Williams Formula One drivers
24 Hours of Daytona drivers
Laureus World Sports Awards winners
Italian amputees
Paralympic cyclists of Italy
Paralympic gold medalists for Italy
Cyclists at the 2012 Summer Paralympics
Italian male cyclists
European Touring Car Championship drivers
European Touring Car Cup drivers
Medalists at the 2012 Summer Paralympics
Blancpain Endurance Series drivers
24 Hours of Spa drivers
Paralympic silver medalists for Italy
Medalists at the 2016 Summer Paralympics
Italian disabled sportspeople
Deutsche Tourenwagen Masters drivers
Paralympic medalists in cycling
Chip Ganassi Racing drivers
RC Motorsport drivers
Racing Bart Mampaey drivers
Rahal Letterman Lanigan Racing drivers
Mo Nunn Racing drivers
BMW M drivers